Jack Frost 2: The Revenge of the Mutant Killer Snowman (also known as simply Jack Frost 2) is a 2000 American direct-to-video comedy slasher film written and directed by Michael Cooney. Taking place one year after the events of its predecessor, the film again follows killer snowman Jack Frost (Scott MacDonald), who is resurrected and travels to a tropical cabana to kill the man (Christopher Allport) responsible for his death.

Jack Frost 2: The Revenge of the Mutant Killer Snowman has attracted a cult following over the years for its B movie effects and comical death scenes.

Plot

Sam Tiler (Christopher Allport) has been struggling to recover from the encounter with Jack Frost (much to everyone else's disbelief and amusement), ever since he rampaged through his hometown last Christmas. To get away from the stress, Sam's wife Anne (Eileen Seeley) suggests a tropical vacation in a cabana far away in the Pacific for the wedding of his deputy, Joe Foster (Chip Heller) and his secretary Marla (Marsha Clark). Sam reluctantly agrees, after reinforcement from his doctor (Ian Abercrombie).

Meanwhile, the FBI has dug up the antifreeze used to dissolve Jack (voiced by Scott MacDonald) attempting to test it for remains of the genetic material. One of the janitors (Brett A. Boydstun) accidentally spills a cup of coffee into the tank of antifreeze, waking Jack up and causing him to reform and break free. Jack, now sharing a psychic link with Sam because of Sam's blood mixing with Jack in the antifreeze, follows Sam.

Sam, Anne, Marla and Joe arrive to a greeting by the eccentric Colonel Hickering (Ray Cooney) and his assistants Captain Fun (Sean Patrick Murphy) and Bobby (Tai Bennett). Jack washes ashore and kills three women, Ashlea (Shonda Farr), Paisley (Granger Green), and Rose (Jennifer Lyons). The next morning, the Colonel discovers the bodies and tries to cover up the whole mess, as he does not want this to ruin his resort. However, the island's security head, Agent Manners (David Allen Brooks) who had survived Jack's maiming of him, suspects that Jack has returned.

Jack continues his rampage, killing a beach model named Sarah (Melanie Good) and stabbing her cameraman Greg (Paul H. Kim) to death with his carrot nose. Sam begins to suspect that something is amiss when he runs into Manners, who agrees to an alliance in order to stop Jack Frost. Sam, Captain Fun (who is actually Manners' undercover assistant), and Manners stage a trap to capture Jack. This fails as the snowman they capture was really the Colonel in costume.

After slaying another beach model named Cindy (Stephanie Chao) by freezing the pool she is swimming in and drowning her, Jack decides that the tropics are a bit too warm and freezes the place, causing it to snow and freeze the lifeguard (Kerri V. Griffin). The party guests begin to play around in snowball fights when Jack enters the fray, killing at least another dozen. Sam, Anne, Marla, Manners and Joe lock themselves up in their room, using antifreeze to keep Jack at bay.

Sam and Manners decide to find help, and end up finding a room where the Colonel, Captain Fun, and Bobby have barricaded themselves in. Sam asks the three of them where they can find antifreeze, to which Bobby suggests they use the coolant for the generator, which uses the same material. Luring Jack into a trap, Sam once again tricks Jack into a pool of coolant. Unfortunately, this does not work, as Jack has become much more resilient to the antifreeze due to his time in the lab. Jack spits out a snowball and flees, followed by Manners, into the woods.

Sam, Anne, and the others observe the snowball and it "hatches" and becomes a baby snowman, who kills Captain Fun. They trap the snowman in a blender and try many different ways of killing it, all of which fail. Meanwhile, Manners has followed Jack to a shed, where he sees that Jack has spit up dozens of snowball children. He calls the others and tells them what he has seen, but before leaving he is attacked and devoured by the tiny snowmen.

Sam, in a panic, is pushed to the side as Anne takes charge in order to get Joe and the Colonel to go around the island to trap as many of the snowmen as they can until the supply boat comes, while Bobby, Marla and Sam wait back in the kitchen. During the search, the snowmen kill seven more tourists. Eventually, Anne realizes that they can be killed by bananas, due to Sam being allergic to bananas. As a result, Jack would share the same vulnerabilities, since he absorbed some of Sam's genetics in Snowmonton. Everybody soon makes a big batch of banana smoothies, which they then use to kill the tiny snowmen. However, one of them crawls back to Jack, fatally wounded. Jack picks it up and observes it, and then watches it slowly die in his arms.

Jack sheds a tear, mourning the loss of his new family. He then becomes angry, stabbing the Colonel through the head with an icicle from behind and slitting Bobby's throat with another icicle. Marla and Joe flee and lock themselves in the freezer with Captain Fun's body, while Anne is attacked by Jack. Sam snaps out of his paranoia and shoots Jack with a banana attached to an arrow, causing him to explode. Anne and Sam embrace each other and walk towards the ocean, prepared to leave the island with any of the other surviving guests.

During the credits, the two sailors on the supply boat are crushed by a giant carrot, implying that Jack is still alive. After the credits roll, we're shown that Joe and Marla were accidentally left in the freezer.

Cast

 Christopher Allport as Sam Tiler
 Scott MacDonald as Jack Frost (voice)
 Eileen Seeley as Anne Tiler
 Chip Heller as Joe
 Marsha Clark as Marla
 Ray Cooney as Colonel Hickering
 David Allen Brooks as Agent Manners
 Sean Patrick Murphy as Captain Fun
 Tricia Pettitt as First Mate of Fun
 Tai Bennet as Bobby
 Jennifer Lyons as Rose
 Shonda Farr as Ashlea
 Granger Green as Paisley
 Ian Abercrombie as Doctor Morton
 Melanie Good as Sarah
 Paul H. Kim as Greg
 Stephanie Chao as Cindy
 Doug Jones as Dave
 Stefan C. Marchand as Charlie
 Brian Gross as Dean

Reception
Like its predecessor, Jack Frost 2: The Revenge of the Mutant Killer Snowman was panned by critics.  On Rotten Tomatoes the film has 4 reviews, all negative.

Accolades

Proposed sequel
In December 2016, writer and director Michael Cooney revealed there were plans for a third film in the series, which would have featured a giant Jack Frost known as "Jackzilla". The film would have picked up a decade following the ending of the second film, with a giant Jack Frost letting loose on a city causing destruction and mayhem. Cooney expressed interest in making the third installment, due to the advancement in special effects, and would be happy if someone would be willing to help him make it as it holds a special place in his heart.

References

External links
 
 
 Jack Frost 2: Revenge of the Mutant Killer Snowman at the Disobiki.

2000s Christmas horror films
2000 comedy horror films
2000 films
American Christmas horror films
American comedy horror films
American monster movies
American slasher films
Giant monster films
Slasher comedy films
2000s English-language films
2000s American films